The 1929–30 Penn Quakers men's ice hockey season was the 14th season of play for the program.

Season
Penn began the season under the leadership of NHL alumnus Herb Gardiner but he turned control of the team over to William Farson after the first game. The initial match against the Penn Athletic Club, a collection of former college players, happened early in the season and did so while the team was missing a pair of starters. The loss of Strain in goal was catastrophic; the team was hammered 10–4 with little coming from the game other than knowing that they needed improved play in net.

While coach Farson tried to address the problem in goal with the addition of Klein to the team, he added Quaker football player Greene to the defense, hoping that he would shore up the early deficiencies. The second game was played against St. John's just before the winter break with Woods shifted to forward in place of LaGhost and, though the team did show a great deal of improvement, they were able to eek out a 6–5 victory in overtime.

After returning from the break, the team went through a series of intensive practices to get them ready for the match against Amherst, which had been added to the schedule just prior to the St. John's game. The defense turned in a much better effort, limiting their opponents to just 3 goals but the team fell to purple team 2–3. Rough play characterized the next game a week later and several penalties led to Penn surrendering their early advantage.

The team had a quick turnaround for their next match and welcomed one of the strongest teams in the country on the 21st. Clarkson proved too much for the Quakers to handle and dispatched Penn 0–12. Penn's losing streak continued through a match with Colgate and the team entered the semester break with little to show for their efforts.

The first game after the break resulted in another loss for the Quakers. Penn began slow, with only Klein's play keeping them in the match. The team surged in the final 20 minutes, however, and tried to overcome Williams lead, ultimately failing to surpass the Ephs. The team then played their lone road game of the season the following week, losing to Brown to extend their streak to six games.

Penn finally won another game when they met Villanova near the end of February. The two teams entered the third period tied at 1-all but the Quakers' offense exploded for 6 goals in the final frame, doing so in front of approximately 1,000 spectators. The team headed into their final pair of games for the season without their captain as O'Reilly was out with an illness. In spite of his absence, the Quakers defeated the visiting Dutchmen and did so in convincing fashion. The team continued the inspired play with a second consecutive shutout, downing RPI 2–0 and ending on a high note.

The moderate success of the team and the support from the student body led most to believe the program would return the following year, however, the realities of the Great Depression eventually took their toll. The expensive program was suspended before the next season began. The team returned in an unofficial capacity at the beginning of the next decade but World War II prevented anything from formally occurring until the mid-60's.

Roster

Standings

Schedule and Results

|-
!colspan=12 style=";" | Regular Season

References

Penn Quakers men's ice hockey seasons
Penn
Penn
Penn
Penn